Valence-en-Poitou is a commune in the Vienne department in the Nouvelle-Aquitaine region in western France. It was established on 1 January 2019 by merger of the former communes of Couhé (the seat), Ceaux-en-Couhé, Châtillon, Payré and Vaux.

Population

See also
Communes of the Vienne department

References

Communes of Vienne